Madarij-ul-Nabuwwah is a book by Islamic scholar 'Abd al-Haqq al-Dehlawi (1551–1642) who lived in Delhi during the Mughal era.

See also
List of Sunni books

References

Sunni literature
17th-century Indian books

Indian religious texts
Indian non-fiction books